Mike Beckmann (born 27 October 1967) is a German gymnast. He competed at the 1988 Summer Olympics where he placed twelfth in the team final with the team from West Germany.

References

External links
 

1967 births
Living people
German male artistic gymnasts
Olympic gymnasts of West Germany
Gymnasts at the 1988 Summer Olympics
People from Ennepe-Ruhr-Kreis
Sportspeople from Arnsberg (region)